Julian Emmanuel Golding is an English former international sprinter.

Athletics career
Golding was born in Harlesden, North West London. Attending St Augustine's Church of England High School in Kilburn, he enjoyed playing all sports before taking up athletics seriously in 1991. He was discovered by former Olympic sprinter Mike McFarlane, after finishing second at the Westminster Schools Athletics Competition.

At the 1998 European Athletics Championships, Golding was favourite to win the gold medal in the 200 metres.  After running a series of fast times and winning both heats and semi-finals convincingly, he was beaten by teammate Dougie Walker in the final, winning a bronze medal.

In the same year, he represented England and won two gold medals in the 200 metres and 4 x 100 metres relay, at the 1998 Commonwealth Games in Kuala Lumpur, Malaysia. In the 200 metres he set a personal best time of 20.34 seconds in the semi-finals. In the 4 x 100 metres sprint relay, the team ran a new Commonwealth Games record of 38.20 seconds. He also helped the Great British 4 x 100-metre relay team to victory in the 1998 IAAF World Cup and European Cup, as well as running the last leg at the 1997 World Championships in Athens, in which Britain won bronze.

During the 1999 athletic season, Golding won the national title in 20.20 seconds (wind assisted) and continued that form, winning some high profile international Grand Prix events. The Crystal Grand Prix is considered to be one of Golding's best performances; he won the 200 metres from a world class field in the time of 20.23 seconds, running into a strong headwind of −1.1 metres per second. Golding went on to finish 7th in the final of the 1999 World Championships in Seville, and finished the year ranked number nine in the world.

He was part of Team GB's 4 x 100-metre relay team at the 2000 Summer Olympics in Sydney, but the team were disqualified in the first round. He failed to qualify for his preferred event, due to illness at the Olympic Trials.

Golding's last major competition was in 2003, where he represented Great Britain at the Paris World Championships.  Three years later, he was forced to retire prematurely due to persistent injuries.

Personal life
On 18 July 2012, Golding graduated from Middlesex University with First Class Honours for Sports and Exercise Science with Teaching & Coaching. Julian is now a qualified P.E teacher working at St Mary Magdalene's Secondary Phase.

Personal bests
His time of 20.18 seconds (−0.2) ranks him sixth on the 200 metres All-Time UK rankings, with only John Regis, Christian Malcolm, Linford Christie, Darren Campbell and Adam Gemili ahead of him.

100 metres – 10.28 (1998)
200 metres – 20.18 (1998)
 150 metres  – 15.39w (1995)

Achievements

References

External links

1975 births
Living people
English male sprinters
British male sprinters
Commonwealth Games gold medallists for England
Athletes (track and field) at the 1998 Commonwealth Games
World Athletics Championships medalists
European Athletics Championships medalists
People educated at St Augustine's Church of England High School
Athletes from London
People from Harlesden
Commonwealth Games medallists in athletics
Medallists at the 1998 Commonwealth Games